The 2008 Fareham Council election took place on 1 May 2008 to elect members of Fareham Borough Council in Hampshire, England. Half of the council was up for election and the Conservative Party stayed in overall control of the council.

After the election, the composition of the council was:
Conservative 22
Liberal Democrat 9

Campaign
Before the election the Conservatives held 22 seats compared to 9 for the Liberal Democrats, with the Conservatives having run the council for the previous 9 years. Other candidates stood from the Labour Party, Green Party, United Kingdom Independence Party, British National Party and the English Democrats Party, but the election was seen as being mainly between the Conservatives and Liberal Democrats.

Both the Conservatives and Liberal Democrats pledged to improve parking in Fareham, oppose a proposed gravel extraction site and build less new houses. The Conservatives defended their record in control of the council pointing to low council tax rates, extra hours of free bus travel for pensioners and recycling at 46% of waste. However the Liberal Democrats promised to revert to weekly rubbish collection instead of the fortnightly service that was introduced in 2005, improve street cleaning and scrap a fee for calling out pest controllers.

Election result
The results saw no seats change hands with the Conservatives keeping control with a majority of 13. The Conservatives held 12 seats, many with increased majorities, the Liberal Democrats held 3, while Labour failed to win any seats and came last in many wards. The largest majority was in Sarisbury where the Conservatives won over 82% of the vote, while the closest results came in Stubbington and Fareham East, with the Liberal Democrats holding Fareham East by 80 votes after a recount. The only ward to see a new councillor was Titchfield where Conservative Tiffany Harper replaced Francis Devonshire, who stepped down at the election. Overall turnout in the election was 40.25%.

Ward results

Fareham East

Fareham North

Fareham North West

Fareham South

Fareham West

Hill Head

Locks Heath

Park Gate

Portchester East

Portchester West

Sarisbury

Stubbington

Titchfield

Titchfield Common

Warsash

References

2008
2008 English local elections
2000s in Hampshire